Leirnuten is a mountain in the municipality of Suldal in Rogaland county, Norway.

References

Mountains of Rogaland
Suldal